Marc Jones may refer to:
Marc Jones (rugby union) (born 1987), rugby union player
Marc Edmund Jones, astrologer
Marc Jones (police commissioner), Lincolnshire Police and Crime Commissioner, England

See also
Mark Jones (disambiguation)
Marcus Jones (disambiguation)